Daniel Evans was the defending champion but lost in the second round to Peter Polansky.

Michael Mmoh won the title after defeating Polansky 7–5, 2–6, 6–1 in the final.

Seeds

Draw

Finals

Top half

Bottom half

References
Main Draw
Qualifying Draw

Knoxville Challenger - Singles